The 1975 Swedish Grand Prix was a Formula One motor race held at the Scandinavian Raceway at Anderstorp on 8 June 1975. It was race 7 of 14 in both the 1975 World Championship of Drivers and the 1975 International Cup for Formula One Manufacturers. It was the sixth Swedish Grand Prix after it was first held as the Swedish Summer Grand Prix in 1933, and the third to be held at Scandinavian Raceway. It was held over 80 laps of the four kilometre circuit for a race distance of 322 kilometres.

The race was won by Austrian driver Niki Lauda driving Ferrari 312T. He took a six-second victory over the Brabham BT44B of Argentinian racer Carlos Reutemann. Lauda's Ferrari teammate, Swiss driver Clay Regazzoni finished third. It was Lauda's third consecutive win of the season after the Monaco and Belgian Grands Prix. The win strengthened his lead in the championship to ten points with Reutemann moving past Emerson Fittipaldi into second place.

Race report
Qualifying resulted in pole position for Vittorio Brambilla in his March, while Lauda qualified fifth fastest and his teammate Clay Regazzoni 11th. In the race Brambilla took the lead, but by lap 16 he was overtaken by Carlos Reutemann's Brabham and eventually had to retire with a blistered front tyre. Tom Pryce had to pit early due to throttle slides being clogged by sand, whilst Patrick Depailler suffered a brake line leak. Hunt retired on lap 22 with a brake-pipe leak, promoting Regazzoni and Mario Andretti. Poor Jean-Pierre Jarier lost second place to failing oil pressure on lap 38. Young Tony Brise was showing little respect for his elders, overtaking Mark Donohue and Ronnie Peterson and then challenging championship leader Emerson Fittipaldi. The battle which ensued slowed them up and John Watson in the Surtees had soon climbed up behind them. Meanwhile, Lauda was steadily progressing through the field and on lap 42 he was second. He put a series of fastest laps, benefiting from a harder tyre compound, closed on Reutemann and overtook him to win the Grand Prix by 6 seconds. Reutemann finished second with Regazzoni, in the other Ferrari 312T, third. Brise had his gearbox jammed in fourth and surrendered to Donohue, but on his third Grand Prix gained his first World Championship point and Graham Hill's first as a constructor. It would prove the only point of Brise's promising but brief F1 career. Fittipaldi suffered braking problems and was passed by Jody Scheckter at the race end to finish in eighth.

Classification

Qualifying

Race

Championship standings after the race

Drivers' Championship standings

Constructors' Championship standings

Note: Only the top five positions are included for both sets of standings. Only the best 6 results from the first 7 races and the best 6 results from the last 7 races counted towards the Championship. Numbers without parentheses are Championship points; numbers in parentheses are total points scored.

References

Swedish Grand Prix
Swedish Grand Prix
Grand Prix
Swedish Grand Prix